Sargis Sargsian (born 3 June 1973) is a former professional tennis player from Armenia.

Sargsian turned pro in 1995, and has won one singles and two doubles titles during his career on the ATP Tour. He played for Armenia at the 1996 and 2000 Summer Olympics, in Atlanta he reached second round, but in Sydney he lost in first round.

Sargsian also played at the 2004 Summer Olympics. He reached career-high rankings of World No. 38 in singles and World No. 33 in doubles during 2004. Sargsian retired in 2006 and now resides in Florida.

ATP career finals

Singles: 3 (1 title, 2 runner-ups)

Doubles: 5 (2 titles, 3 runner-ups)

ATP Challenger and ITF Futures Finals

Singles: 11 (4–7)

Doubles: 2 (2–0)

Performance timelines

Singles

Doubles

External links
 
 
 

1973 births
Living people
Armenian expatriate sportspeople in the United States
Armenian male tennis players
Olympic tennis players of Armenia
Sportspeople from Boca Raton, Florida
Sportspeople from Yerevan
Tennis people from Florida
Tennis players at the 1996 Summer Olympics
Tennis players at the 2000 Summer Olympics
Tennis players at the 2004 Summer Olympics
Universiade medalists in tennis
Universiade silver medalists for Armenia
Arizona State Sun Devils men's tennis players